Manta is a commune in Cahul District, Moldova. It is composed of two villages, Manta and Pașcani.

References

Communes of Cahul District